Cerithiopsis paucispiralis is a species of sea snail, a gastropod in the family Cerithiopsidae, which is known from around Cape Verde. It was described by Rolán and Fernandes, in 1989.

References

 Rolán E. & Fernandes F. (1989) Cerithiopsis paucispiralis n.sp. para el archipielago de Cabo Verde. Apex 4(1-2): 37-39
 Rolán E., 2005. Malacological Fauna From The Cape Verde Archipelago. Part 1, Polyplacophora and Gastropoda.

paucispiralis
Gastropods of Cape Verde
Gastropods described in 1989